Brynjar Leifsson (born 11 September 1990) is an Icelandic musician. He is best known as the lead guitarist of the Icelandic indie folk band Of Monsters and Men.

Personal life
Brynjar was raised in Keflavík, a town in southwest Iceland. His brother is a pilot.

Brynjar has been in a relationship with musician Ragnhildur Gunnarsdóttir since at least 2014. The two have a son named Hilmir Hrafn Brynjarsson.

Of Monsters and Men
Brynjar joined Nanna Bryndís Hilmarsdóttir's solo project, Songbird in 2009. The project soon expanded with Ragnar Þórhallsson and Arnar Rósenkranz Hilmarsson joining. The band then entered the 2010 annual Icelandic music competition Músíktilraunir, which they won. The band eventually became Of Monsters and Men. They soon released their debut studio album My Head Is an Animal in late 2011. The album charted in multiple regions and the band gained popularity worldwide. After a successful first album, the band released their second studio album Beneath the Skin in 2015. Their third album, Fever Dream, was released in 2019. Brynjar is currently the lead guitarist in the band.

See also 

 List of Icelandic writers
 Icelandic literature

External links
Of Monsters and Men's Official Site

References

Brynjar Leifsson
Brynjar Leifsson
Brynjar Leifsson
1990 births
Living people
People from Keflavík
Brynjar Leifsson
Brynjar Leifsson
Lead guitarists
21st-century guitarists
Of Monsters and Men members
21st-century male musicians